is a former Japanese football player.

Club career
Nishitani was born in Tokushima on September 16, 1978. After graduating from high school, he joined Cerezo Osaka in 1997. He was originally forward, he played as left midfielder in professional career. He played many matches from 1998. However his opportunity to play decreased in 2001 and the club was relegated to J2 League end of 2001 season. From 2002, he played some clubs, Vissel Kobe (2002-03), Vegalta Sendai (2004) and Urawa Reds (2005). However he could hardly play in the match in both clubs. In September 2005, he moved to J2 League club Consadole Sapporo. He played many matches and the club won the champions in 2007 and was promoted to J1 League. He retired end of 2008 season.

National team career
In August 1995, Nishitani was selected Japan U-17 national team for 1995 U-17 World Championship, but he did not play in the match.

Club statistics

References

External links

1978 births
Living people
Association football people from Tokushima Prefecture
People from Tokushima (city)
Japanese footballers
J1 League players
J2 League players
Cerezo Osaka players
Vissel Kobe players
Vegalta Sendai players
Urawa Red Diamonds players
Hokkaido Consadole Sapporo players
Association football midfielders